The 2004 Men's Hockey RaboTrophy was the second edition of the men's field hockey tournament. The RaboTrophy was held in Amsterdam from 26 June to 4 July 2004, and featured four of the top nations in men's field hockey.

Germany won the tournament for the first time, defeating the Netherlands 5–4 in the final.

The tournament was held in conjunction with the Women's RaboTrophy.

Competition format
The four teams competed in a pool stage, played in a single round robin format. At the conclusion of the pool stage, the top two teams contested the final, while the remaining teams played off for third place.

Teams
The following four teams competed for the title:

Officials
The following umpires were appointed by the International Hockey Federation to officiate the tournament:

 Jamil Butt (PAK)
 Peter Elders (NED)
 Satinder Kumar (IND)
 David Leiper (SCO)
 Markus Petter (GER)

Results
All times are local (Central European Time).

Preliminary round

Pool

Fixtures

Classification round

Third and fourth place

Final

Statistics

Final standings

Goalscorers

References

External links
Official Website

RaboTrophy
Hockey RaboTrophy
Men's Hockey RaboTrophy
Hockey RaboTrophy
Hockey RaboTrophy
Sports competitions in Amstelveen